Cynometra is genus of tropical forest trees with a pantropical distribution. It is particularly important as a forest component in west Africa and the neotropics. Cynometra alexandri (muhimbi) is a familiar timber tree of central and east Africa. The genus is a member of the subfamily Detarioideae. It has been suggested that Cynometra is polyphyletic and is in need of revision. In 2019, beside description of 4 new species (i.e. Cynometra cerebriformis, C. dwyeri, C. steyermarkii and C. tumbesiana),  suggested that the species formerly recognized as Maniltoa should be included in this genus and some of the mainland tropical African species (those with asterisk in the list below) excluded from this genus because of their jointed pedicels and dehiscent fruits (he has not yet published any new combination for them, though).

Species

 Cynometra abrahamii 
 Cynometra alexandri* 
 Cynometra americana 
 Cynometra ananta* 
 Cynometra ankaranensis 
 Cynometra aurita 
  
 Cynometra bauhiniifolia 
 Cynometra beddomei 
 Cynometra bourdillonii 
 Cynometra brachymischa 
 Cynometra brachyrrhachis* 
  
  
 Cynometra capuronii 
 Cynometra cauliflora 
 Cynometra cebuensis 
  
 Cynometra commersoniana 
 Cynometra congensis 
 Cynometra copelandii 
 Cynometra craibii 
 Cynometra crassifolia 
 Cynometra cubensis 
 Cynometra cuneata 
  
 Cynometra dauphinensis 
  
  
  
  
 Cynometra engleri* 
 Cynometra falcata 
 Cynometra filifera* 
 Cynometra fissicuspis 
 Cynometra floretii 
  
 Cynometra gillmanii* 
 Cynometra glomerulata 
 Cynometra grandiflora  (syn. Maniltoa grandiflora )
 * 
 * 
 Cynometra hemitomophylla 
  
 Cynometra hostmanniana 
 Cynometra humboldtiana 
 Cynometra inaequifolia 
 Cynometra insularis 
 Cynometra iripa 
 Cynometra katikii 
   (syn. Maniltoa lenticellata )
 * 
  
 Cynometra longicuspis 
 Cynometra longifolia 
 Cynometra longipedicellata* 
 Cynometra lujae* 
 Cynometra lukei 
 Cynometra lyallii 
 Cynometra macrocarpa 
 Cynometra madagascariensis 
  
 Cynometra mannii 
 Cynometra marginata 
  
 Cynometra marleneae 
 Cynometra mayottensis 
  
 Cynometra megalophylla 
  
   (syn. Maniltoa minor )
 Cynometra minutiflora 
  
  
 Cynometra nyangensis* 
 Cynometra oaxacana 
 Cynometra oddonii* 
 * 
 Cynometra parvifolia 
 Cynometra pedicellata* 
 Cynometra pervilleana 
 Cynometra phaselocarpa 
  
 Cynometra polyandra 
 Cynometra portoricensis 
  
 Cynometra ramiflora 
 Cynometra retusa 
   (syn. Maniltoa rosea )
 Cynometra roseiflora 
 Cynometra sakalava 
  
  
 Cynometra schlechteri 
 Cynometra schottiana 
 * 
 Cynometra simplicifolia 
 Cynometra sphaerocarpa 
  
  
  
 Cynometra suaheliensis* 
 Cynometra travancorica 
 Cynometra trinitensis 
  
 Cynometra ulugurensis* 
   (syn. Maniltoa vestita ) 
   (syn. Maniltoa floribunda )
 Cynometra vogelii 
 Cynometra warburgii 
 Cynometra webberi* 
  
 Cynometra zeylanica

References

 
Fabaceae genera